Bluff or The Bluff may refer to:

Places

Australia
 Bluff, Queensland, Australia, a town
 The Bluff, Queensland (Ipswich), a rural locality in the city of Ipswich
 The Bluff, Queensland (Toowoomba Region), a rural locality
 Bluff River (New South Wales)
 Bluff River (Murchison River), a river of Tasmania
 Bluff River (Prosser River), Tasmania; see Levendale, Tasmania
 "The Bluff", common name of Rosetta Head, a headland adjoining Victor Harbor in South Australia

United States
 Bluff, Alabama, an unincorporated community
 Bluff, Alaska, a ghost town
 The Bluff (Atlanta), Georgia, a neighborhood of Atlanta
 Bluff (Pittsburgh), Pennsylvania, a neighborhood
 Bluff, Texas, an unincorporated community
 Bluff, Utah, a town
 Bluff Creek (California), a watercourse in California that empties into Ballona Wetlands
 Bluff Creek (Des Moines River tributary), a stream in Iowa
 Bluff Creek (Cimarron River tributary), a stream in Kansas; see Clark County State Lake
 Bluff Swamp, Ascension Parish, Louisiana

Other places
 Bluff, New Zealand, a town and seaport in the South Island (colloquially known as The Bluff)
 Bluff River (New Zealand)
 Bluff, KwaZulu-Natal, South Africa, a geographical region of Durban
 Yamate, a neighborhood of Yokohama, Japan, often called "The Bluff" in English
 The Bluff, a mound near Ypres, Belgium, fought over by the British and Germans in the First World War Actions of the Bluff, 1916
 The Bluff, Bahamas, the name of three communities
 The Bluff (Cayman Islands), the highest point of the Cayman Islands, located on the island of Cayman Brac
 Bluff Island (Andaman and Nicobar Islands)
 Bluff Island (Antarctica), Prydz Bay, Antarctica
 Bluff Island (Hong Kong), Port Shelter, Sai Kung District, Hong Kong

Game-oriented 
 Bluff (poker), a tactic in the game of poker
 Bluff (magazine), covering poker
 A slang term for liar's dice, a dice game

Film and TV 
 Bluff (2007 film), a Canadian film
 Bluff (1976 film) an Italian crime-comedy film
 Bluff (1924 film), an American drama silent film
 Bluff (1916 film), an American comedy silent film directed by Rae Berger
 "Bluff" (Prison Break episode), an episode of the 2006 television series Prison Break
 Bluff (TV series), a Canadian game show broadcast by CBC Television

People 
 nickname of Benjamin Wade (1800–1878), American lawyer and politician
 Richard Bluff, English visual effects supervisor

Other uses 
 Bluff (geography) is a steep slope or rounded cliff, usually overlooking a shoreline or other body of water

See also 
 Bluff City (disambiguation)
 Bluff Hill (disambiguation)
 El Bluff, Nicaragua, a coastal port city
 El Bluff Airport, a former airport
 BLUF (disambiguation)
 Bluffs, Illinois, a village